The Game of Life, also known simply as Life, is a board game originally created in 1860 by Milton Bradley as The Checkered Game of Life, the first ever board game for his own company, the Milton Bradley Company. The Game of Life was US's first popular parlour game. The game simulates a person's travels through their life, from early adulthood to retirement, with college if necessary, jobs, marriage, and possible children along the way. Up to six players, depending on the version, can participate in a single game. Variations of the game accommodate up to ten players.

The modern version was originally published 100 years later, in 1960. It was created and co-designed by Bill Markham and Reuben Klamer, respectively, and was "heartily endorsed" by Art Linkletter.  It is now part of the permanent collection of the Smithsonian's National Museum of American History and an inductee into the National Toy Hall of Fame.

History

The game was originally created in 1860 by Milton Bradley as The Checkered Game of Life, and was the first game created by Bradley, a successful lithographer. The game sold 45,000 copies by the end of its first year. Like many 19th-century games, such as The Mansion of Happiness by S. B. Ives in 1843, it had a strong moral message.

The game board resembled a modified checkerboard. The object was to land on "good" spaces and collect 100 points. A player could gain 50 points by reaching "Happy Old Age" in the upper-right corner, opposite "Infancy" where one began.
Instead of dicewhich were associated with gamblingplayers used a six-sided top called a teetotum.

Modern game

In 1960 the modern Game of Life was introduced. A collaboration between Reuben Klamer and Bill Markham, it consists of a track which passes along, over, and through small mountains, buildings, and other features. A player travels along the track in a small plastic automobile, according to the spins of a small wheel on the board with spaces numbered one through ten. Each car has six holes into which pegs are added as the player "gets married" and "acquires children". Some "early modern" editions have eight cars. The modern game pegs are pink and blue to distinguish the sexes (blue for male, pink for female). Each player starts the game with one peg.

There is also a bank which includes money in $5,000, $10,000, $20,000, $50,000, and $100,000 bills; automobile, life, fire, and/or homeowners' insurance policies (depending on the version); $20,000 promissory notes and stock certificates. Other tangibles vary between versions of the game. $500 bills were dropped in the 1980s as were $1,000 bills in 1992. The rules in all different modern versions of the game are generally the same even though they may have different cards and spaces.

Versions

1960s version
The Game of Life, copyrighted by the Milton Bradley Company in 1960, had some differences from later versions. For example, once a player reached the "Day of Reckoning" space, they had to choose one of two options. The first was to continue along the road to "Millionaire Acres," if the player believed they had enough money to out-score all opponents. The second option was to try to become a "Millionaire Tycoon" by betting everything on one number and spinning the wheel. The player immediately won the game if the chosen number came up, or went to the "Poor Farm" and was eliminated if it did not. If no player became a Millionaire Tycoon, the one with the highest final total won the game. In addition, there were spaces that forced a player to go back; in the case a player landed on one of these, they were forced to take the shortest route and pay no attention to any penalties and rewards in doing so.

This version had Art Linkletter as the spokesman, included his likeness on the $100,000 bills (with his name displayed on the bills as "Arthur Linkletter Esq.") and a rousing endorsement from Linkletter on the cover of the box. It was advertised as a "Milton Bradley 100th Anniversary Game" and as "A Full 3-D Action Game."

As of 2022, Winning Moves markets a classic 1960s edition.

1970s/1980s versions
About halfway through the production of this version, many dollar values doubled. This description focuses on the later version with the larger dollar amounts. The late 1980s version also replaced the convertibles from earlier versions with minivans. Early 1960s-era convertibles were still used in the 1978 edition.  The "Poor Farm" was renamed "Bankrupt!" in which losing players would "Retire to the country and become a philosopher", and "Millionaire Acres" was shortened to "Millionaire!" in which the winner can "Retire in style". Like the 1960s version, there were spaces that forced a player to go back; in the case a player landed on one of these, they were forced to take the shortest route and pay no attention to any penalties and rewards in doing so.

The gold "Revenge" squares added a byline, "Sue for damages", in the 1978 edition.

1991 version
Exactly seven years after Hasbro acquired the Milton Bradley Company, The Game of Life was updated in 1991 to reward players for good behavior, such as recycling trash and helping the homeless, by awarding players "Life Tiles", each of which was worth a certain amount. At the end of the game, players added up the amounts on the tiles to their cash total, and counted towards the final total. The spaces that forced players to go back were removed, starting with this version.

The 1998 PC and Sony PlayStation video game adaptations of The Game of Life by Hasbro's own video game production company are based on this version.  Players could play either the "classic" version using the Life Tiles, or the "enhanced" version where landing on a space with a Life Tile allow players to play one of several mini-games. The PC version was later re-released in 2003 by Atari Interactive, under ownership from Infogrames Entertainment SA, as the result of a merger between Hasbro Interactive and the old Atari Interactive.

2005 version
An updated version of the game was released in 2005 with a few gameplay changes. The new Game of Life reduced the element of chance, although it is still primarily based on chance and still rewards players for taking risks.

2013 version 
The 2013 version removed the lawsuit square which was replaced by a lawsuit card. A new "keep this card for 100k" feature was added as well.

2017 version

The 2017 version includes pegs and squares for acquiring pets.

2021 version

Includes invest cards and 6 different peg colors. Also included a pets edition.

Other versions

Board games
 Hello Kitty Edition (1999, Japan Only)
 The Game of Life in Monstropolis (Monsters, Inc. version) (2001)
 The Game of Life Card Game (2002)
 Fame Edition (or Game of Life Junior/travel version) (2002)
 Star Wars: A Jedi's Path (2002)
 Pirates of the Caribbean (2004)
 The Simpsons Edition (2004)
 Bikini Bottom SpongeBob SquarePants Edition (2005)
 Pokémon Edition (2006, Japan only)
 Pirates of the Caribbean: Dead Man's Chest (2006)
 Twists and Turns Edition (2007)
 The Game of Life Express (2007)
 Indiana Jones Edition (2008, Target exclusive)
 Family Guy Collectors Edition (2008)
 The Wizard of Oz Edition (2009)
 The Game of Life - Haunted Mansion Theme Park Edition (2009)
 The Game of Life High School Edition (aka "Pink Edition")
 LIFE: Rock Star Edition
 The Game of LIFE: It's a Dog's Life Edition (2011)
 The Game of LIFE: Despicable Me (2014)
 LIFE: My Little Pony Edition
 Inside Out (2015)
  LIFE: Yo-Kai Watch Edition (2016)
  The Game of Life: Quarter Life Crisis (2019)
  Super Mario Edition: The Game of Life (2021)
  The Game of LIFE: Jurassic Park Edition  (2022)

Video games

 RPG Jinsei Game Nintendo Entertainment System (NES) video game (1993)
 Super Jinsei Game series
 Super Jinsei Game Super Famicom video game (1994)
 Super Jinsei Game 2 Super Famicom video game (1995)
 Super Jinsei Game 3 Super Famicom video game (1996)
 The Game of Life for PC and PlayStation (1998)
 Special Jinsei Game for GameCube (2003)
 The Game of Life/Yahtzee/Payday Game Boy Advance game (2005)
 The Game of Life Wii game (2008)
 The Game of Life WiiWare game (2009) (Japan Only)
 The Game of Life Classic Edition iPhone game (2009)
 Hasbro Family Game Night 3 for Xbox 360, Wii, and PlayStation 3 video game platforms, and was also later released as part of the Hasbro Family Game Night Fun Pack, which consisted as a compilation of both Hasbro Family Game Night 2 and Hasbro Family Game Night 3.
  The Game of Life: 2016 Edition for iOS, Android & Steam by Marmalade Game Studio (2016)
The Game of Life 2 for iOS, Android & Steam by Marmalade Game Studio (2020)
The Game of Life 2 for Nintendo Switch, PlayStation 4, PlayStation 5, Xbox One, and Xbox Series X (2022)

Television show
 Game Show Edition on The Hub (2011)

See also
 Life as a BlackMan (board game)

References

External links
 
 The Game of Life 1960s rules at Winning-Moves.com
 The Game of Life rules from 1977 at Hasbro.com
 The Game of Life rules from 1991 at Hasbro.com
 The Game of Life rules from 2000 at Hasbro.com

Economic simulation board games
Children's board games
Roll-and-move board games
Milton Bradley Company games
1861 introductions
Board games introduced in the 1860s
American board games